Bulwell Hall Halt railway station was a halt between Nottingham and Hucknall on the Great Central Railway main line, the last main line to be built from the north of England to London, opened on 15 March 1899.

History

Bulwell Hall Halt was opened on 24 April 1909, some 10 years after the line itself - the Great Central Railway's London Extension through Nottingham. The halt had two platforms constructed of timber, and was located approximately 100 yard north of Lawton Drive, or half a mile north of the lengthy Bulwell Viaduct which spanned the Leen Valley.

The halt's main purpose was to serve Nottingham City Golf Course, however during World War I it was also used by troops. It did not appear in public timetables until 1911. Low patronage led to its closure on 5 May 1930; the line itself closed on 5 September 1966.

Present day

No trace of the halt remains today, however a footpath following the railway's trackbed through the site is extant.

References

Disused railway stations in Nottinghamshire
Former Great Central Railway stations
Railway stations in Great Britain opened in 1909
Railway stations in Great Britain closed in 1930